Potturi Venkateswara Rao (8 February 1934 – 5 March 2020) was an Indian Telugu language journalist. He worked with all major Telugu dailies like Andhra Bhoomi, Eenadu, Andhra Prabha and Udayam.

Early life
Potturi Venkateswara Rao was born in Potturu, Guntur, Andhra Pradesh.

Career
Potturi Venkateswara Rao's career started with Andhrajanata in 1957.  He was the chief editor of Eenadu, a widely circulated Telugu daily, at one point in his life. He writes columns in all major Telugu newspapers. He worked as Chairman of  the Press Academy.

He co-authored a book in English on P. V. Narasimha Rao called as Years of Power.

Bibliography
 Aadhyatmika Padakosham – Dictionary of Philosophic words in Telugu
 Naatipatrikala Meti Viluvalu – October 2000
 Chintana – a compilation of articles (2001 March)
 Chirasmaraneeyulu – (personality sketches) (March 2001)
 Years of Power

References

Journalists from Andhra Pradesh
1934 births
2020 deaths
Telugu-language writers
People from Guntur district